Cirrus duplicatus is a variety of cirrus cloud. The name cirrus duplicatus is derived from Latin, meaning "double". The duplicatus variety of cirrus clouds occurs when there are at least two layers of cirrus clouds. Most of the time, occurrences of cirrus fibratus and cirrus uncinus are in the duplicatus form. Like stratus clouds, cirrus clouds are often seen in the duplicatus form.

See also
List of cloud types

References

External links
International Cloud Atlas – Cirrus duplicatus

Cirrus